Dnipro tram is the system of electric trams including 14 tram routes (with 163 stops) within the city of Dnipro. It has been operating since 1897.

History 

The Yekaterinoslav tram was opened on 27 June 1897 (according to the modern Gregorian calendar and 14 June according to the Julian calendar). At the time of opening it was is the third tram system operating in the Russian Empire (its predecessors were Kyiv Tram and Nizhny Novgorod Tram). The construction and operation was provided by the Belgian company Tramways électriques d'Ekaterinoslaw. By the end of 1897, two million people had been transported. The routes were:
 Steamboat hithe – Proviant str. (Paster Street) – Catherine the Great ave. (Dmytro Yavornytskyi ave.);
 Jordan str (Kotsyubynskyi str.) – Karaimska str (Shyrshov str);
 Catherine the Great ave. (Dmytro Yavornytskyi ave.) – Alexander str (Sichovykh striltsiv str) – Big Market str.
On 21 April 1906, an alternative tram network was opened in Yekaterinoslav. In 1918, the operating companies merged, as well as the tram networks. In 1931, the tram depot included 177 trams, and the network length reached . On 6 November 1932, the tracks were converted from narrow gauge to Russian gauge. The conversion was completed by 1948.

In the years between 1970 and 1990, the rolling stock was changed for cars from ČKD Tatra. Later, the tramcars were also produced on the premises of Pivdenmash. By 1996, the rolling stock included about 400 trams, the overall ridership was 115 million passenger per year. By that time 19 tram lines existed.

Rolling stock 
As of 1 January 2014, the rolling stock consists of 33 maintenance carriages and 275 passenger carriages including types 71-605 – 9 carriages, 71-608K – 5, 71-608 km – 23, Tatra T3D – 26, Tatra T3SU – 122, Tatra T6B5 – 12, Tatra T4D – 48, Tatra T6A2M – 30.

In August 2021, the Dnipropetrovsk Regional State Administration announced a tender in the Prozorro system for the purchase of three-section low-floor trams for the cities of Dnipro and Kryvyi Rih.

Late August 2021 Ukraine and Switzerland signed a memorandum of understanding, according to whom Dnipro would receive 15 new Stadler Rail rolling stock. In 2019 Dnipro's rolling stock was expanded with 20 used Tatra T4D trams from Leipzig, Germany.

References

External links

Tram transport in Ukraine
Rail transport in Dnipro
Dnipro